The 13257 / 13258 Danapur - Anand Vihar Terminal Jan Sadharan Express is a Superfast Express train belonging to Indian Railways – East Central Railway zone that runs between  and  in India.

It operates as train number 13257 from Danapur to Anand Vihar Terminal and as train number 13258 in the reverse direction, serving the states of Bihar & Delhi.

It is part of the Jan Sadharan Express series launched by the former railway minister of India, Mr. Laloo Prasad Yadav.

Coaches
The 13257/58 Danapur–Anand Vihar Jan Sadharan Express has 20 General Unreserved & 2 SLR (Seating cum Luggage Rake) coaches. It does not carry a pantry car.

As is customary with most train services in India, coach composition may be amended at the discretion of Indian Railways depending on demand.

Service

As the average speed of the train is above , as per Indian Railways rules, its fare includes a Superfast surcharge.

Routeing

Traction
As the route is fully electrified, a Gomoh / Kanpur / Ghaziabad-based WAP-7 locomotive powers the train for its entire journey.

Operation
13257 Danapur–Anand Vihar Jan Sadharan Express leaves Danapur on a daily basis arriving Anand Vihar Terminal the next day.
13258 Anand Vihar–Danapur Jan Sadharan Express leaves Anand Vihar Terminal on a daily basis arriving Danapur the next day.

References

External links
Indian Railway

Transport in Patna
Transport in Delhi
Jan Sadharan Express trains
Rail transport in Uttar Pradesh
Rail transport in Bihar
Rail transport in Delhi